Kettle Creek is a stream in the U.S. state of Georgia. It is a tributary to the Satilla River.

Kettle Creek was named from an incident when an iron kettle was found by soldiers along its banks.

References

Rivers of Georgia (U.S. state)
Rivers of Ware County, Georgia